Muppalla is a village in NTR district of the Indian state of Andhra Pradesh. It is located in Chandarlapadu mandal of Vijayawada revenue division. Average population as of 2012 is 3,800.

Geography
Muppalla is located 5 km south of Nandigama and 7 km north of Chandarlapadu

References

Villages in NTR district